Yordan Kyosev is a German scientist and professor of Bulgarian origin, working in the area of textile and clothing technologies and machines. His book Braiding technology for textiles(2014) becomes the main modern source for learning Industrial Braiding and received book prize. He is as well the main developer of a few unique software packages for 3D modeling braided structures, braiding machines and warp knitted structures. The algorithms of these are documented in "Topology-Based Modeling of Textile Structures and Their Joint Assemblies"(2019)

Professional career
Kyosev finished 5 years engineering course in Textile Technology at the Technical University of Sofia, Bulgaria. After that, he studied M.Sc. Course in Applied Mathematics and Informatics at the same university and defended PhD Thesis in the area of textile machines in 2002, again there. Between 2006 and 2019 he was Professor for "Textile Materials, Textile Technology and Quality Management" at Hochschule Niederrhein - University of Applied Sciences, Mönchengladbach, Germany, with specialty of braiding and narrow weaving. He is the initiator and organisator of the International Week of Narrow and Smart Textiles (2014, 2016, 2018, 2020- postponed because of covid), which becomes main meeting point for exchange of experts, industrials and researchers in this area.,
In 2019 he moved to Technical University Dresden as holder of the chair "Development and assembly of textile products", ITM.

Works

Applied Mathematics 
Kyosev developed algorithms for solving fuzzy linear systems of equations, providing first implementing of the theory of Ketty Peeva. In the book, cited more than 200 times the algorithms are applied for max-min operations, applied as inference engine for diagnostics of technical, medical and other systems. Later they extend the algorithms for max-product operations, which tends to provide more closer relations of the variables to the natural processes.

Textiles 
Kyosev developed the worldwide first module for 3D visualization of warp-knitted fabrics for the company ALC Computertechnik (2006-2008), Aachen, successfully integrated into industrial software Warp3D.
The complexity of the warp knitted structures and the challenges of their modeling was summarized in his habilitation work, while the knowledge of the construction of the warp knitted fabrics in a separate book Warp Knitted Fabrics Construction(2019).

4D Body scanning 
Since 2021 his chair is leading in the area of application of 4D (high speed) 3D body scanning systems for development of functional clothing. He organized the international conference "Clothing-Body-Interaction" in 2021 which got a lot of feedback in the community and looks to collect the main players in the area for the event in 2023,

(Co-) Authored books 

 Peeva, K., Kyosev, Y., Fuzzy Relational Calculus: Theory, Applications and Software (with CD-ROM), World Scientific, 2004
 Kyosev, Y., Braiding technology for Textiles, Woodhead Publishing (2014)
 Kyosev, Y., Warp knitting fabrics construction, Springer, 2019
 Kyosev, Y., Topoogy based modelling of textile structures and their assemblies, Springer, 2019

(Co-) Edited Books
Kyosev, Y, (Editor) Advances in the braiding technology (Editor) (2016)
Kyosev, Y. (Editor) Recent advances in the narrow textiles  (2016)
Kyosev, Y:, Mahltig, B., Schwarz-Pfeiffer, A. (Eds) Narrow and Smart Textiles, Springer, 2018
Mahltig, Y., Kyosev, Y. (Eds) Inorganic and Composite Fibers: Production, Properties, and Applications, Elsevier, 2018

Journals

 Since 2017 Editor-in-Chief of "Journal of Engineered Fibers and Fabrics", published by SAGE.
 Since 2020 is founder and co-Editor-in-Chief of the journal Communications in Development and Assembling of Textile Products

Awards 
Alexander von Humboldt Research Fellowship (2005)

Niederrhein Book Award for "Braiding technology for textiles"(2017)

References

TU Dresden
Living people
1973 births